Innovate UK is the United Kingdom's innovation agency, which provides money and support to organisations to make new products and services. It is a non-departmental public body operating at arm's length from the Government as part of the United Kingdom Research and Innovation organisation.

History 
Innovate UK has its roots as an advisory body – the Technology Strategy Board – established in 2004, within the Department of Trade and Industry (DTI), before becoming an independent body in July 2007 after the reorganisation of the DTI into the Department for Innovation, Universities and Skills (DIUS) and the Department for Business, Enterprise and Regulatory Reform (BERR) under Gordon Brown's government.

The original Technology Strategy Board had its roots in the Innovation Review published by the DTI in December 2003, and the Lambert Review. This reconfigured the major funding mechanism as the Collaborative Research and Development Technology Programme, transformed the pre-existing Faraday Partnerships into Knowledge Transfer Networks, renamed the Teaching Company Scheme as Knowledge Transfer Partnerships and set up an Advisory Board made up of 12 people from business, venture capital and regional government.  These changes all took place in 2004, with the Advisory Board being appointed in October of that year.

In the 2006 budget, Gordon Brown announced the intention to set up the Technology Strategy Board as a "non-departmental public body" operating at "arm's length" from the UK Government.  It was decided to locate the new organisation in Swindon, and to recruit a team primarily with business experience.

In August 2014, the organisation adopted the name Innovate UK, and began a transition to use the new name in all its communications. However, the legal name of the organisation continued to be the "Technology Strategy Board".

Under the Higher Education and Research Act 2017, effective April 2018, Innovate UK ceased to report to the Department for Business, Energy and Industrial Strategy and became a council of the newly established UK Research and Innovation (UKRI) organisation.

Key people 
Dr Ian Campbell was appointed as interim executive chair in early 2018 and stepped down in the summer of 2020; The current CEO is Indro Mukerjee. Campbell was preceded by neuroscientist Ruth McKernan, who held the chief executive post for the three years leading up to the transition to UK Research and Innovation.

See also
 EngineeringUK
 Foundation for Science and Technology
 Institution of Engineering and Technology
 Institute of Knowledge Transfer
 NESTA

References

External links
 

British research associations
Department for Business, Energy and Industrial Strategy
Funding bodies in the United Kingdom
Government agencies established in 2007
Innovation in the United Kingdom
Innovation organizations
Knowledge transfer
Non-departmental public bodies of the United Kingdom government
Organisations based in Swindon
Research and development in the United Kingdom
Science and technology in Wiltshire
Technology strategy
2007 establishments in the United Kingdom